Sabera fuliginosa, the white-fringed swift, is a butterfly of the family Hesperiidae. It is found in Australia along the north-east coast of Queensland, as well as in Papua, Indonesia, and Papua New Guinea.

The wingspan is about 40 mm.

The larvae feed on Calamus moti. During the day they hide in a shelter created by folding over the edge of a leaf of their host plant and joining it with silk.

Subspecies
Sabera fuliginosa fuliginosa (Queensland)
Sabera fuliginosa chota (New Guinea)

External links
The Life History of Sabera fuliginosa fuliginosa (Miskin) (Lepidoptera: Hesperiidae) and additional hostplants for the other members of the genus in Northern Queensland
Australian Insects
Australian Faunal Directory

Taractrocerini
Butterflies described in 1889